Sir John Charles Puddester (4 October 1881 – 22 April 1947) was a businessman and political figure in Newfoundland. He represented Bay de Verde from 1924 to 1932 and Carbonear-Bay de Verde from 1932 to 1934. Puddester was then appointed to the Commission of Government, serving until his death in 1947.

He was born in Northern Bay, the son of Mark Puddester and Sarah Sellers. Puddester married Mary Moores and had nine children. After teaching school from 1899 to 1903, he became an accountant with Reid Newfoundland Company, working there until 1916. From 1916 to 1932, he was business manager for the St. John's Daily News. Puddester ran unsuccessfully for a seat in the Newfoundland assembly in 1923 before being elected the following year. He served in the Executive Council as Secretary of State. Puddester was Commissioner of Public Health and Welfare and became vice-chairman of the Commission of Government in 1938. In the 1930s and 1940s, Puddester initiated a program to transcribe parish baptism and marriage records dating from the period before civil registration began in 1891. He was knighted in 1939. Puddester died in St. John's in 1947.

References 

Members of the Newfoundland and Labrador House of Assembly
Knights Bachelor
1881 births
1947 deaths
Members of the Newfoundland Commission of Government
Dominion of Newfoundland politicians